The Gaibang (丐幫）is a fictional martial arts organisation featured prominently in works of wuxia fiction by writers such as Jin Yong, Gu Long and Wolong Sheng. The gang has also found its way into martial arts films such as King of Beggars and video games such as Age of Wushu. The gang's members are mostly beggars as its name suggests, but some of them are from other walks of life. They are noticeable in public for their dress code and behaviour. The members adhere to a strict code of conduct and maintain the utmost respect for rank and hierarchy. They uphold justice and help those in need through acts of chivalry. The Beggars' Gang is also one of the supporting pillars in the defence of Han Chinese society from foreign invaders. The gang has a wide network of communications and the members are reputed for their excellent information gathering skills. This is due to the gang's large size and the nature of its members, which allows them to easily blend into different segments of society.

History 
The gang was founded during the Han dynasty and has survived for centuries. The gang plays significant roles in wuxia novels such as Demi-Gods and Semi-Devils (Northern Song dynasty) and the Condor Trilogy (Southern Song dynasty to Yuan dynasty).

The Beggars' Gang was one of the largest and most respected martial arts organisations in the jianghu (martial artists' community) until the Yuan dynasty. Its fame and popularity began to decline in the Yuan dynasty due to ill discipline among its members and incompetent leadership.

Organisation 
The gang is divided into various factions, including the "dirty clothing" faction and the "clean clothing" faction. The former consists of typical beggars, while the latter comprises non-beggar members. It has many branches spread throughout the land and each of them is headed by a duozhu.

Each member carries at least one pouch-like bag and the number of bags he/she carries indicates his/her rank in the gang. The highest rank a member can attain is that of an elder, which is second only to the chief. Elders carry nine bags each.

The gang is headed by the chief, who represents the highest authority in the gang. Each chief is selected from a pool of nominees based on his/her prowess in martial arts, contributions to the gang, personal conduct and popularity, among other factors. The chief carries the revered Dog Beating Staff as a symbol of leadership. The gang has various practices and customs, such as the one which allows all members to spit once on a newly elected chief as a form of salute.

The Four Great Elders serve as the chief's deputies and reserve the right to strip the chief off his post if he/she fails in his/her duties. Besides, there are also elders with designated duties, such as the Discipline Elder, who enforces law and order in the gang, and the Training Elder, who oversees the martial arts training of members.

The gang holds monthly meetings in a different location each time.

Skills and martial arts 
The most notable martial arts of the Beggars' Gang are the Eighteen Subduing Dragon Palms and the Dog Beating Staff Technique. The chief is expected to have a profound mastery of both skills, especially the latter, which is only passed on from a chief to his/her successor. No other members know the Dog Beating Staff Technique. The gang has a battle formation known as the Dog Beating Formation.

Since members are not limited to only beggars, people from all walks of life, including scholars and soldiers, join the gang. As such, the gang's martial arts are rather diverse, since some members have learnt other forms of martial arts prior to joining the gang. For example, Wu Changfeng in Demi-Gods and Semi-Devils uses a customised saber movement while Chen Guyan carries a sack filled with poisonous creatures for use against enemies.

Eighteen Subduing Dragon Palms 
The Eighteen Subduing Dragon Palms, also translated as Eighteen Palms to Defeat the Dragon, is based on and named after ideas derived from the ancient divination text Yi Jing. Chronologically, it is first mentioned in Demi-Gods and Semi-Devils as the best known skill of Qiao Feng, the chief of the Beggars' Gang. There were originally 28 stances, which Qiao Feng later simplified to 18 with the help of his sworn brother Xuzhu. After Qiao Feng's death at the end of the novel, Xuzhu passed the knowledge of the skill to the next chief of the Beggars' Gang. In The Legend of the Condor Heroes, the protagonist Guo Jing learns the Eighteen Subduing Dragon Palms from Hong Qigong, the chief of the Beggars' Gang, and uses it as his primary skill against opponents such as Ouyang Feng, Mei Chaofeng, Huang Yaoshi and Qiu Qianren. In the sequel The Return of the Condor Heroes, Guo Jing, now a supporting character, uses the Eighteen Subduing Dragon Palms on multiple occasions in combat, while Hong Qigong uses it in his final battle against Ouyang Feng. In The Heaven Sword and Dragon Saber, Shi Huolong, the chief of the Beggars' Gang, had mastered only 12 of the 18 stances and had used it to defend himself when he was ambushed by Cheng Kun, the main antagonist.

The 18 stances are:

 The Proud Dragon Repents
 The Dragon Soars in the Sky
 The Dragon is Seen in the Fields
 The Swan Descends Gracefully
 Use Not the Submerged Dragon
 A Sudden Advent
 Crossing Great Rivers
 Tremors that Shook the Land
 Diving into the Abyss
 The Twin Dragons Fetch Water
 The Fish Frolics in the Depths
 Timely Riding the Six Dragons
 Dark Clouds but No Rain
 With a Loss comes Confidence
 The Dragon Fights in the Wilderness
 Treading on Ice
 The Ram Charges into the Fence
 The Divine Dragon Swishes its Tail

Dog Beating Staff Technique 
The Dog Beating Staff Technique has ten stances:

 A Fierce Dog Blocks the Path
 Whack Two Dogs with a Staff
 Oblique Hit on the Dog's Back
 Flip the Dog Upside-down
 Retrieve the Staff from the Mastiff's Jaws
 Whack the Dog's Head with a Staff
 Reverse Jab the Dog's Bottom
 Lift the Mad Dog with the Staff
 Squash the Dog's Back
 No Dogs Under Heaven

Notes 

Organizations in Wuxia fiction